Moses ben Eliezer Jaffe of Bologna (Hebrew: רבי משה בן אליעזר יפה מבולוניה; died 1480) was a prominent Polish-Italian rabbi.

He was born in Lesser Poland around 1400 to Eliezer ben Meir Jaffe, a German-born rabbi and scholar. In his early years he married Margolioth bat Samuel HaLevi, who is described as being a very learned woman. In the mid-15th-century he was removed to Bologna, Italy, where he served as the city's Av Bet Din and is mentioned in the "Shalshelet ha-Ḳabbalah" manuscript at St. Petersburg.  Moses died in Bologna around 1480. His son is Abraham of Bohemia.

References 

15th-century Polish rabbis
15th-century births
1480 deaths
15th-century Italian rabbis
Clergy from Bologna